Football was contested for men only at the 1979 Summer Universiade in Mexico City, Mexico.

References
 Universiade football medalists on HickokSports

U
1979 Summer Universiade
Football at the Summer Universiade
International association football competitions hosted by Mexico